The Roots Picnic is an annual music festival created and hosted by hip hop group, The Roots. Co-founder, Shawn Gee, and manager of The Roots serves as executive producer of the festival. The festival is held in Philadelphia, their hometown at the Mann at Fairmount Park.  The first festival was held on June 7, 2008.

The festival is a one-day event but for one year it was expanded for two-days in 2012. It was expanded again in 2022. Another festival was held outside of Philadelphia in 2016.

Lineups by year

Inaugural Roots Picnic 
June 7, 2008
The Roots, Gnarls Barkley, Sharon Jones & the Dap-Kings, Santogold, Deerhoof, J*Davey, Diplo, Esperanza, DJ Jazzy Jeff, The Cool Kids

2nd Annual Roots Picnic 
June 6, 2009
Main Stage: The Roots, TV on the Radio, The Black Keys, Public Enemy, Antibalas, Santogold, Busdriver, Elevator Fight featuring Zoë Kravitz, DJ Cash Money

Second Stage: Kid Cudi, Asher Roth, Writtenhouse, Back to Basics (King Britt & Dozia), Dave P., Francis and the Lights, Bajah + The Dry Eye Crew

3rd Annual Roots Picnic 
June 5, 2010
The Roots, Vampire Weekend, Method Man, Ghostface Killah, Raekwon, John Legend, Mayer Hawthorne & the Country, The Very Best, Das Racist, Nneka, Clipse, DJ Jazzy Jeff, Jay Electronica, Bajah + The Dry Eye Crew, Tune-Yards, The Foreign Exchange, Pattern Is Movement, Memory Tapes, DJ Diamond Kuts, Money Making Jam Boys

4th Annual Roots Picnic 
June 4, 2011
Main Stage: The Roots, Nas, Wiz Khalifa, Esperanza Spalding, Edward Sharpe and the Magnetic Zeros, The Dismemberment Plan, Little Dragon, Railbird, Ariel Pink's Haunted Graffiti, DJ J Period

Vitamin Water Uncapped Stage: Yelawolf, Mac Miller, Black Thought, Man Man, Live Mixtape, Nicos Gun, Hank & Cupcakes, Donn T, OCD/Reda, Young Vipers, T. Millz

5th Annual Roots Picnic 
June 2, 2012
The Roots, De La Soul (backed by The Roots), Wale, Flosstradamus, Danny Brown, James Murphy (DJ set), The Hood Internet, Kids These Days, Mr. MFN eXquire, Shabazz Palaces, St. Vincent, Star Slinger, OCD: Moosh & Twist, Stretch Armstrong, Tune-Yards

June 3, 2012
The Roots, Kid Cudi, Major Lazer, Rakim (backed by The Roots), Diplo, Chill Moody, Quadron, Jessi Teich, Gianni Lee, Selah Sue, Reda, Grand Prize Winners, From Last Year

6th Annual Roots Picnic 
June 1, 2013
Gary Clark Jr, Grimes, Macklemore & Ryan Lewis, Naughty By Nature (backed by The Roots), Solange, DJ Premier, The Gaslamp Killer, Trinidad Jame$, Joey Bada$$, Hit-Boy, How To Dress Well, Robert Glasper, Sonnymoon, Jennah Bell, Lushlife

7th Annual Roots Picnic 
May 31, 2014
Columbus Stage: Snoop Dogg (backed by The Roots), Janelle Monáe, The War on Drugs, Jhené Aiko, G-Eazy, Rudimental, Bad Rabbits, Emily Wells, Electric Wire Hustle

Oasis Stage: AraabMuzik, Action Bronson, A$AP Ferg, Biz Markie (DJ set), Just Blaze, Chill Moody, Roman Gianarthur

8th Annual Roots Picnic 
May 30, 2015
Pier Stage: Erykah Badu (backed by The Roots), The Weeknd, A$AP Rocky, Phantogram, Chronixx and the Zincfence Redemption, Rae Sremmurd, Moses Sumney

Harbor Stage: DJ Mustard, Raury, Hiatus Kaiyote, Bishop Nehru, Marc E. Bassy

Oasis Stage: Hudson Mohawke, DJ Windows 98 (Win Butler of Arcade Fire), Afrika Bambaataa (DJ set), King Britt, Brianna Cash, Donn T

9th Annual Roots Picnic 
June 4, 2016 (Philadelphia)
North Stage: Future, Blood Orange, Swizz Beatz, Jidenna, Migos, Willow Smith, Paris Monster, GoGo Morrow

South Stage: Usher (backed by The Roots), Leon Bridges, DMX, Kehlani, Anderson .Paak & The Free Nationals, Ibeyi, Lolawolf, Jodie Abacus

Oasis Stage: Kaytranada, Metro Boomin, Everyday People feat. DJ Moma, Lil Uzi Vert, Lil Dicky, Rich Medina, Tish Hyman, Chloe x Halle

October 1, 2016 (New York)
5th Ave Stage: D'Angelo & John Mayer (backed by The Roots), X Ambassadors, DJ Questlove, Kevin Gates, Jungle Brothers, Emily Wells, SMSHNG HRTS, DJ Swizzymack

6th Ave Stage: Everyday People feat. DJ Moma, Stretch & Bobbito, Lady Leshurr, Neal Brennan, Chargaux, Chill Moody, Tish Hyman

October 2, 2016 (New York)
5th Ave Stage: David Byrne x Nile Rodgers x Wu-Tang Clan (backed by The Roots), Trombone Shorty & Orleans Avenue, Swizz Beatz, Deerhoof, Lil Uzi Vert, Echosmith, Daniel "Bambaataa" Marley, Bibi Bourelly

6th Ave Stage: DJ Jazzy Jeff, Black Thought's Live Mixtape, Grits & Biscuits, Jerrod Carmichael, EPMD, Yuna, Kyra Caruso

10th Annual Roots Picnic 
June 3, 2017
North Stage: Pharrell (backed by The Roots), Lil Wayne, Thundercat, Black Thought Live Mixtape, Michael Kiwanuka, Noname, Anthony Somebody of quiteHYPE

South Stage: Solange, Jeezy, Kimbra, 21 Savage, PnB Rock, James Vincent McMorrow, Tunji Ige

Oasis Stage: Gilles Peterson, A Boogie wit da Hoodie, Playboi Carti, Pete Rock, DJ Spinna, DJ N.O.C., DJ Diamond Kuts

Gaming & Culture Stage: Fashion & Lifestyle Panel, Madden & NFL 2K Competitions hosted by iPodKingCarter

11th Annual Roots Picnic 
June 2, 2018
North Stage: The Roots Jam Session hosted by Dave Chappelle with 2 Chainz, Brandy & special guests, 6lack, DJ Drama presents Gangsta Grillz with special guests, Black Thought & J.Period Live Mixtape feat. Fabolous & Jadakiss, GoldLink, Rapsody, Jojo Abot, Capa Artist

South Stage: Lil Uzi Vert, Dvsn, Dirty Projectors, Rich the Kid & Jay Critch, BadBadNotGood, Sun Ra Arkestra, DJ Diamond Kuts, ZAHSOSA

Oasis Stage: The Diplomats, Grits & Biscuits, DJ Kid Capri, DJ SpinKing, Tierra Whack, Bri Steves

Podcast Stage: Drink Champs, On One with Angela Rye, Questlove Supreme, ItsTheReal, The Realest Podcast Ever

Gaming/Culture Stage: "Barrier Breakers" Panel featuring Bozoma Saint John, Shari Bryant, Jemele Hill, Amber Grimes & Anowa Adjah, "Keynote of Change" Conversation featuring Wallo267 & Fox TV host Quincy Harris, Art & Fashion Panel featuring Timothy Anne Burnside, Kerby Jean-Raymond, Distortedd & Tiffany Reid, Madden & NBA 2K Tournaments curated by iPodKingCarter

12th Annual Roots Picnic 
June 1, 2019
Fairmount Park Stage: The Roots performing Things Fall Apart 20th Anniversary, H.E.R., 21 Savage, Lil Baby, Davido, City Girls, Ari Lennox, Tobe Nwigwe, Leven Kali, Asiahn

The Mann Stage: Raphael Saadiq vs. Soulquarians, Black Thought & J.Period Live Mixtape feat. Yasiin Bey, Queen Naija, Tank & The Bangas, Blueface, Moonchild, Resistance Revival Chorus

Cricket Wireless Stage: The Joe Budden Podcast, DJ Aktive, The Read, Questlove Supreme, The Originals feat. DJ Clark Kent, Stretch Armstrong, D-Nice, Rich Medina & Tony Touch, Guys Next Door Podcast, DJ R-Tistic

13th Annual Roots Picnic Virtual Experience 
Originally scheduled for May 30, 2020, the festival was moved to August 1 in the wake of Coronavirus. Eventually, the festival was cancelled altogether. A YouTube livestream was set up instead, partnering with Michelle Obama's When We All Vote organization. It premiered on June 27, 2020 at 8 PM EST and 5 PM PST.

Performances: H.E.R., Lil Baby, Roddy Ricch, SZA, Kirk Franklin, Snoh Aalegra, D-Nice, Polo G, G Herbo, Musiq Soulchild, EarthGang

Appearances: Michelle Obama, Janelle Monáe, Tracee Ellis Ross, Kerry Washington, Tom Hanks, Liza Koshy, Chris Paul, Elaine Welteroth, Lin-Manuel Miranda, Deon Cole, Coach K, Wallo267, Ghetto Gastro

Snoh Aalegra and Musiq Soulchild are the only performers featured on the initial lineup to appear in the livestream. Aalegra was billed as a headliner alongside Meek Mill, Summer Walker, DaBaby, Burna Boy and Thundercat. Soulchild was to perform alongside SWV and Brandy with The Roots as the backing band. Other notable performances that were planned included Black Thought & J.Period's Live Mixtape, which would've featured Griselda, Raekwon and Ghostface Killah, and Meshell Ndegeocello performing reimaginations of Prince songs. Some of the performers are scheduled to appear at the next festival.

14th Annual Roots Picnic 
June 4-5, 2022
Mary J. Blige with The Roots, Summer Walker, Wizkid, Jazmine Sullivan, Kamasi Washington, J.Period Live Mixtape featuring Black Thought, Rick Ross & Benny the Butcher, Soulquarians Jam Session featuring Keyshia Cole, SWV & Musiq Soulchild, Masego, Kirk Franklin, G Herbo, Tierra Whack, Freddie Gibbs, Mickey Guyton, Yebba, Chief Keef, Robert Glasper & Bilal, DJ Jazzy Jeff & Rakim, Babyface Ray, Muni Long, CKay, Protoje, Serpentwithfeet, Ambre, Alex Isley, Tone Stith, Kur, Durand, Suzanne Christine, Mu Mu Fresh, Tye Tribbett, Jordan Hawkins, Macc n Cheese, Aquil Dawud, DJ Diamond Kuts, DJ Aktive

Live Podcast Stage curated by Wallo267 & Gillie Da Kid: Million Dollaz Worth of Game, Rory & MAL, Questlove Supreme, Earn Your Leisure, WHOREible Decisions, Jemele Hill Is Unbothered, Carefully Reckless with Jess Hilarious, FAQ Podcast with Fuzzy & Quincy Harris, Around the Way Curls, Podcast Bols, Disruptors in the Culture

References

External links

Music festivals in Philadelphia
Music festivals established in 2008
The Roots